The phrase limiting case has several different meanings in:

 Limiting case (mathematics)
 Limiting case (philosophy of science)